SCM U Craiova is a volleyball club based in Craiova, Romania.

Honours 
Divizia A1:
Winners (1): 2016
Second Place (4): 2013, 2017, 2020, 2021
Third Place (3): 2015, 2019, 2022

Romanian Cup:
Winners (1): 2023
Runners-up (2): 2021

See also
 Romania men's national volleyball team

External links
Official website
CEV profile

Romanian volleyball clubs 
Sport in Craiova